Sayyid Muḥammad ʿAmīmul Eḥsān al-Barkatī was a Bangladeshi Islamic scholar who served as the third Khatib of the Baitul Mukarram National Mosque.

Early life 
He was born on 24 January 1911 (22 Muharram, 1329 Hijri) Monday at Bihar state in Munger district a village named Pachna in India. His father was Muhammd Hakeem Abdul Mannan and mother was Sayeda Sajeda. He was second among four brothers and three sisters. His family is from the Feni District of present-day Bangladesh.

Education 
He received his primary Islamic education from his paternal uncle Abdud Dayyan. Later on, he had gained the knowledge of Tasawwuf from a  Sufi scholar of India, Shah Abu Barkat Ali Shah. As he had become a murid of him, he added the title Barkati to his surname.

Barkati acquired his academic learning from the famous Calcutta Aliah Madrasah in 1926.

Career 
In 1934, Barkati was appointed as the Imam and teacher of Calcutta Nakhoda Masjid. In 1935 he also got the responsibility of Head Mufti of that madrasha's Darul Ifta.
In 1943, he joined Calcutta Aliya Madrasah. In 1964 he became the first khatib of Baitul Mukarram, later the national mosque of Bangladesh. He held that position until his death in 1974.

Works 
Barkati's works include:
Fiqhus-sunan wal Asar
Qawa'idul-Fiqh
Fatwae Barkati
Adabul Mufti
Al usolul kargee
Usolul masailut iktilfat
At tasruf li Adabit Tasuuf
At-tanjed fe tawhid
At tanver fe usole tafseer
Tariqe Islam
Tariqe Ilme Haddes
Tariqe Ilme Fiqh
Sirajum munira Milad nama (سراجا منير)
Tarikae Hajj
Lubbul Usol
Maske Fariez
Minnatul bari
Mijanul Akbar
Miyarul Asar
Wasiyatnama
hadiyatul Musallin

Personal life 

Barkati married Maymuna, daughter of his mentor and a Sufi saint Abu Muhammad Barkat Ali shah. His wife also died early. Then he married Fatima and they have a son, Munim, and a daughter, Amina. Munim died when he was a child. His second wife died in 1937. He married Kadija and lived with her until his death.
Among all the children of Barkati, only her youngest daughter Sayeda Amina Khatun was alive during his death. She died in 1990.
Barkati performed Hajj three times: in 1954, 1958 and in 1971.

Death 

During 1973–74 Barkati's health started to deteriorate. In the year 1974 the committee of Baitul Mukarram had some issues with him to which  he decided to not go again in Baitul Mukarram for further Juma prayer. He returns the key of his room and said "I will not be coming next week". He died on 27 October 1974, 10th Shawwal 1394 Hijri. Next day on 28 October his funeral prayer was held at Baitul Mukarram.

Recognition
Daily inqilab says he has been recognised as a Grand Mufti of Kolkata by Calcutta government of British India in 1935.

Alokito Bangladesh says he had received gold medal and certificates in 1974 for his contribution towards Islamic missionaries from Bangladesh Government.

References

1911 births
1974 deaths
20th-century Indian Muslims
20th-century Muslim scholars of Islam
Bangladeshi imams
Khatib of the national mosque of Bangladesh
Bangladeshi Sunni Muslim scholars of Islam
Bangladeshi people of Bihari descent
People from Munger district
Hanafi fiqh scholars